The following is a list of the Council of Ministers of Mozambique in 1984.

 President: Samora Moises Machel
 Ministers-
 Agriculture: Joao dos Santos Ferreira
 Defense: Alberto Joaquim Chipande
 Economic affairs in the presidency: Jacinto Veloso
 Education and culture: Graça Machel
 Finance: Rui Baltazar dos Santos Alves
 Foreign affairs: Joaquim Alberto Chissano
 Foreign trade: Joaquim Ribiero de Carvalho
 Health: Pascoal Macumbi
 Industry and power: Antonio Lima Rodriques Branco
 Information: Jose Luis Cabaco
 Interior: Armando Guebuza
 Internal trade: Manuel Jorge Aranda da Silva
 Justice: Jose Oscar Monteiro
 Mineral resources: Jose Carlos Lobo
 Planning: Mario da Graça Machungo
 Ports, railways and merchant marine: Luis Alcantara Santos
 Posts and telecommunications: Rui Lousa
 Public works: Júlio Eduardo Zamith Carrilho
 Security: Mariano de Araújo Matsinhe
 Governor of the Bank of Mozambique: Prakash Ratilal
 Vice minister of defense and chief of the General staff of the army: Sebastiao Marcos Mabote

1984 in Mozambique
Government of Mozambique
Mozambique politics-related lists
Lists of government ministers of Mozambique